Baofeng Lake, also spelled Baofeng Hu, is an artificial fresh-water lake in the Wulingyuan Scenic Area located on the south side of Suoxiyu Village, Wulingyuan District, Zhangjiajie City, Hunan, China. It was created in the 1970s.

Baofeng Lake is one of the filming locations for the TV series Journey to the West and Wulong Mountain Suppression of Bandits.

History
In the 1970s, Suoxiyu's local villagers built dams to generate electricity, which inadvertently created a lake. The lake was named Baofeng Lake because it is backed by the Baofeng Mountain.

References

Lakes of Hunan
Zhangjiajie